Guy Friedrich (9 August 1928 – 20 September 2021) was a French professional footballer who played as a midfielder.

Career
Born in Aubagne, Friedrich played for Monaco, Sète, GSC Marseille, Lyon, Cannes, Franc-Comtois, Angers and Roubaix-Tourcoing.

References

1928 births
2021 deaths
French footballers
AS Monaco FC players
FC Sète 34 players
Olympique Lyonnais players
AS Cannes players
Angers SCO players
CO Roubaix-Tourcoing players
Ligue 1 players
Ligue 2 players
Association football midfielders
Racing Besançon players
Sportspeople from Bouches-du-Rhône
People from Aubagne
Footballers from Provence-Alpes-Côte d'Azur